CPLC may refer to:
 Chicanos Por La Causa, community development organization in Arizona, United States
Citizens-Police Liaison Committee, organization in Sindh, Pakistan.
CPLC Community Schools, schools in Tucson, Arizona, United States
Community of Portuguese Language Countries, intergovernmental organization
Master corporal, rank in Canadian forces abbreviated in French (caporal-chef)